Southville is an inner city ward of Bristol, England, on the south bank of the River Avon northwest of Bedminster. Most of the area's houses were built in the late 19th and early 20th centuries for workers in the Bristol coal mining industry or the tobacco factories of W. D. & H. O. Wills, homes of the eponymous "Wills Girls". The world headquarters of Imperial Tobacco, the world's fourth largest international tobacco company, used to be here, but moved to Ashton. Southville was also a centre for the tanning industry.

The area was bombed in the second world war, with many streets losing one or more houses. Southville was the unintended target of the many short-falling bombs aimed at the adjoining dock facilities and traffic. The subsequent post-war rebuilding is noticeable on many streets, where the generic style of house building changes to modern construction. Infilling of wartime damage is still continuing. The house price boom of the early 21st century has seen new builds on existing vacant sites and on bombed sites which had been previously used for other activities such as pre-fabricated garages and car sales lots.

The area has been gentrified since the early 1980s, accompanying the national rise in house prices. It has been jokingly referred to as Lower Clifton, a reference to a more prosperous area of the city. New bars and restaurants and the Tobacco Factory theatre attract visitors to the area, while the Southville Community Centre and Southville School have become the central features of a vibrant community atmosphere. There are many artists living in the area; during the annual Arts Trail which ended in 2018, they opened their houses to the public to show and sell their work.

Dame Emily Park, on the site of the old Dean Lane coal pit head, is celebrated for its popular skateboard park and the vivid graffiti, the latter regularly updated by a variety of artists on a weekly basis. Greville Smyth Park is the largest local park and is popular for sports, families and dog walkers. Bristol South Swimming Pool, a grade II listed building, is in the south of Dame Emily Park. Once a year you can look round the old Slipper Baths here on Bristol Open Doors. Southville Community Development Association (SCDA) is a local community-led organisation that supports many local projects and also runs the Southville Centre - a community centre, café, nursery, after-school club and older people's Monday club.

Southville is also the name of a council ward which includes the northern part of Bedminster, Ashton Gate and Bower Ashton Boundaries recently amended.
Politically, Southville ward has traditionally returned Labour councillors to Bristol City Council, though in 2006 the Green Party candidate Charlie Bolton became the first Green Councillor in Bristol, with a narrow majority of seven votes. In 2015, two Green councillors were elected in Southville.

Southville forms a part of the Bristol South parliamentary constituency, currently represented by Karin Smyth.

References 
balllsack

External links

 Bristol City Council Ward Profile

Areas of Bristol
Wards of Bristol